Phyllonorycter belotella is a moth of the family Gracillariidae. It is known from the Mediterranean region from the Iberian Peninsula to Greece.

The larvae feed on Quercus coccifera, Quercus ilex and Quercus suber. They mine the leaves of their host plant. The mine has the form of an upper surface epidermal, silvery blotch without folds. The frass is partly found as loosely scattered grains and partly as a central, dark brown patch on the roof of the mine. Pupation takes place within the mine in a clear cocoon.

External links
bladmineerders.nl
Fauna Europaea

belotella
Moths of Europe
Moths described in 1859